Murara was a small, short-lived, cinder cone on the flank of Mount Nyamuragira, that began erupting on December 23, 1976.  It is located about twelve kilometers south-southwest of the main crater of Nyamuragira. On 18 January 1977, the height of the cone was measured as 150 metres.

Eruptions from Murara reduced considerably after the eruption of Mount Nyiragongo on January 10, 1977 and ended completely in April 1977.

During the Christmas and New Year holiday period, the Virunga National Park authorities organised a temporary camp, within a few hundred metres of Murara, so that visitors could observe the eruption and lava flow.

References

Further reading
 

Volcanoes of the Democratic Republic of the Congo
Virunga Mountains